Igors Kazanovs (born September 24, 1963) is a former hurdler. Born in Daugavpils, he represented the Soviet Union and later Latvia. He was a soldier in the Soviet army. In the 110 metres hurdles, he finished fifth in the 1987 World Championship final and sixth in the 1993 World Championship final, having run his personal best of 13.26 seconds in the semifinals. In the 60 metres hurdles, he won four European Indoor gold medals and was a two-time medallist at the World Indoor Championships. He also competed at two Olympic Games.

He has a wife and two daughters.

Competition record

References

External links
 
 
 
 

1963 births
Living people
Sportspeople from Daugavpils
Soviet male hurdlers
Latvian male hurdlers
Olympic male hurdlers
Olympic athletes of Latvia
Athletes (track and field) at the 1992 Summer Olympics
Athletes (track and field) at the 1996 Summer Olympics
Competitors at the 1986 Goodwill Games
Competitors at the 1990 Goodwill Games
Competitors at the 1994 Goodwill Games
World Athletics Championships athletes for the Soviet Union
World Athletics Championships athletes for Latvia
World Athletics Indoor Championships medalists
European Athletics Indoor Championships winners
Russian Athletics Championships winners